Angleur is a district of the city of Liège, Wallonia, located in the province of Liège, Belgium.

It was a municipality until 1977. It is located at the foot and on the slope of a hill in the southern part of Liège, located between the rivers Ourthe and Meuse. The lower part involves an area known as Renory and a railway station called Gare d'Angleur and the higher part is located around the roundabout of Sart Tilman where the Liège Science Park is located. Two mansions can be found in the lower part of Angleur : the Chateau Péralta and the Chateau Nagelmackers

On the 24th of July 2019, during the July 2019 European heat wave, the hottest temperate ever recorded in Belgium at the time was recorded in Angleur, a temperature of 40.2 °C, however this recorded was again broken the next day in the Flemish town of Begijnendijk.

Sub-municipalities of Liège
Former municipalities of Liège Province